Archduke Charles of Austria most commonly refers to Archduke Charles, Duke of Teschen (1771–1847).

The title may also refer to:
Archduke Carl Christian of Austria (born 1954)
Archduke Carl Ludwig of Austria (1918–2007)
Archduke Charles Joseph of Austria (1745–1761)
Archduke Charles Joseph of Austria (1649–1664)
Archduke Charles Stephen of Austria (1860–1933)
Archduke Karl Albrecht of Austria (1888–1951)
Archduke Karl Ferdinand of Austria (1818–1874)
Archduke Karl Ludwig of Austria (1833–1896)
Archduke Karl of Austria-Este (1785–1809)
Archduke Karl Pius of Austria, Prince of Tuscany (1909–1953)
Archduke Karl Salvator of Austria (1839–1892)
Charles I of Austria (1887–1922)
Charles II, Archduke of Austria (1540–1590)
Charles of Austria, Bishop of Wroclaw (1590–1624)
Charles VI, Holy Roman Emperor (1711–1740)
Charles, Infante of Spain and Archduke of Austria (1607–1632)
Karl Habsburg-Lothringen (born 1961), current head of the House of Habsburg-Lorraine